Highland games are events held in spring and summer in Scotland and other countries with a large Scottish diaspora, as a way of celebrating Scottish and Celtic culture, especially that of the Scottish Highlands. Certain aspects of the games are so well known as to have become emblematic of Scotland, such as the bagpipes, the kilt, and the heavy events, especially the caber toss. While centred on competitions in piping and drumming, dancing, and Scottish heavy athletics, the games also include entertainment and exhibits related to other aspects of Scottish and Gaelic cultures.

The Cowal Highland Gathering, better known as the Cowal Games, is held in Dunoon, Scotland, every August. It is the largest Highland games in the world, attracting around 3,500 competitors and somewhere in the region of 23,000 spectators from around the globe. Worldwide, however, it is exceeded in terms of spectators by three gatherings in the United States: the estimated 30,000 that attend Grandfather Mountain in North Carolina; the New Hampshire Highland Games & Festival, which attracts over 35,000 annually; and the even larger gathering—the largest in the Northern Hemisphere—that has taken place every year since 1866. This event is currently held on Labor Day weekend in Pleasanton, California, and their Sesquicentennial Games held on 5–6 September 2015, attracted record crowds close to 50,000.

The games are claimed to have influenced Baron Pierre de Coubertin when he was planning the revival of the Olympic Games. De Coubertin saw a display of Highland games at the Paris Exhibition of 1889.

History 
The modern Highland games are largely a 19th-century development, from the period following the Jacobite rebellions and subsequent ban on Highland Dress.

Attempts have been made to discover earlier traditions of games, although evidence is thin. The primary sources are from the bardic traditions of both contests between clans and of tests to select retainers for clan chiefs.

An example of a possible early games venue is at Fetteresso, although that location is technically a few miles south of the Scotland Highlands.

Some modern sources suggest more these games would originate from the deer hunts that the inhabitants of the Highlands engaged in.

The first historical reference to the type of events held at Highland Games in Scotland was made during the time of King Malcolm III (Scottish Gaelic: Máel Coluim; c. 1031 – 13 November 1093) when he summoned men to race up Craig Choinnich overlooking Braemar with the aim of finding the fastest runner in Scotland to be his royal messenger. There are also thought to have been events where the strongest and bravest soldiers in Scotland would be tested. Musicians and dancers were encouraged to reveal their skill and talents and so be a great credit to the clan that they represented.

There is a document from 1703 summoning the clan of the Laird of Grant, Clan Grant. They were to arrive wearing Highland coats and "also with gun, sword, pistol and dirk". From this letter, it is surmised that the competitions would have included feats of arms

Events

Heavy events 

In their original form many centuries ago, Highland games revolved around athletic and sports competitions. Though other activities were always a part of the festivities, many today still consider Highland athletics to be what the games are all about—in short, that the athletics are the Games, and all the other activities are just entertainment. Regardless, it remains true today that the athletic competitions are at least an integral part of the events and one—the caber toss—has come to almost symbolise the Highland games.

 Stone put or “putting the heavy stone”: This event is similar to the modern-day shot put as seen in the Olympic Games. Instead of a steel shot, a large stone of variable weight is often used. There are also some differences from the Olympic shot put in allowable techniques. There are two versions of the stone toss events, differing in allowable technique. The "Braemar Stone" uses a 20–26 lb (9–12 kg) stone for men (13–18 lb or 6–8 kg for women) and does not allow any run up to the toeboard or "trig" to deliver the stone, i.e., it is a standing put. In the "Open Stone" using a 16–22 lb (7–10 kg) stone for men (8–12 lb or 3.5–5.5 kg for women), the thrower is allowed to use any throwing style so long as the stone is put with one hand with the stone resting cradled in the neck until the moment of release. Most athletes in the open stone event use either the "glide" or the "spin" techniques.
 Scottish hammer throw: This event is similar to the hammer throw as seen in modern-day track and field competitions, though with some differences. In the Scottish event, a round metal ball weighing 16 or 22 lb (7.25 or 10 kg) for men, or 12 or 16 lb (5.5 or 7.25 kg) for women, is attached to the end of a shaft about 4 feet (1.2 metres) in length and made out of wood, bamboo, rattan, or plastic. With the feet in a fixed position, the hammer is whirled about one's head and thrown for distance over the shoulder. Hammer throwers sometimes employ specially designed footwear with flat blades to dig into the turf to maintain their balance and resist the centrifugal forces of the implement as it is whirled about the head. This substantially increases the distance attainable in the throw.

 Weight throw, also known as the weight for distance event. There are actually two separate events, one using a light (28 lb for men and 14 lb for women) and the other a heavy (56 lb for men, 42 lb for masters men, and 28 lb for women) weight. The weights are made of metal and have a handle attached either directly or by means of a chain. The implement is thrown using one hand only, but otherwise using any technique. Usually a spinning technique is employed. The longest throw wins.
 Weight over the bar, also known as weight for height. The athletes attempt to toss a 56-pound (4-stone) weight with an attached handle over a horizontal bar using only one hand. Each athlete is allowed three attempts at each height. Successful clearance of the height allows the athlete to advance into the next round at a greater height. The competition is determined by the highest successful toss with fewest misses being used to break tie scores.
The progression and scoring of this event is similar to the Weight Over The Bar. There is significant debate among athletes as to whether the sheaf toss is in fact an authentic Highland event. Some argue it is actually a country fair event, but all agree that it is a great crowd pleaser.
 Maide-leisg (Scots Gaelic meaning 'Lazy Stick'): Trial of strength performed by two men/people sitting on the ground with the soles of their feet pressing against each other. Thus seated, they hold a stick between their hands which they pull against each other until one of them is raised from the ground. The oldest 'Maide Leisg' competition in the world takes place at the Carloway show and Highland Games on the Isle of Lewis.

Many of the Heavy Events competitors in Scottish highland athletics are former high school and college track and field athletes who find the Scottish games are a good way to continue their competitive careers.

Increasingly in the US, the Heavy Events are attracting women and master class athletes which has led to a proliferation of additional classes in Heavy Events competitions. Lighter implements are used in the classes.

Music 

For many Highland games festival attendees, the most memorable of all the events at the games is the massing of the pipe bands. Normally held in conjunction with the opening and closing ceremonies of the games, as many as 20 or more pipe bands will march and play together. The result is a thunderous rendition of Scotland the Brave or Amazing Grace, and other crowd-pleasing favorite's.

It is, in fact, the music of the Great Highland Bagpipe bagpipe which has come to symbolize music at the Games and, indeed, of Scotland itself. In addition to the massed bands, nearly all Highland games gatherings feature a wide range of piping and drumming competition, including solo piping and drumming, small group ensembles and, of course, the pipe bands themselves.

Music at Highland games gatherings also includes other forms, such as fiddle fiddling, harp circles and Celtic bands, usually spiced with a large amount of bagpipe music.

Dance 
The Cowal Highland Gathering hosts the annual World Highland Dancing Championship. This event gathers the best competitive dancers from around the world who compete for the SOBHD sanctioned World Championship title.

Secondary events and attractions 

At modern-day Highland Games events, a wide variety of other activities and events are generally available. Foremost among these are the clan tents and vendors of Scottish related goods. The various clan societies make the Highland games one of the main focus of their seasonal activities, usually making an appearance at as many such events as possible. Visitors can find out information about the Scottish roots and can become active in their own clan society if they wish.

At modern games, armouries will display their collections of swords and armour, and often perform mock battles. Various vendors selling Scottish memorabilia are also present selling everything from Irn-Bru to the stuffed likeness of the Loch Ness Monster.

Herding dog trials and exhibitions are often held, showcasing the breeder's and trainer's skills. In addition, there may be other types of Highland animals present, such as the Highland cattle.

Various traditional and modern Celtic arts are often showcased. These could include harpers' circles, Scottish country dancing, and one or more entertainment stages. In addition, most events usually feature a pre-event ceilidh (a type of social event with traditional music, dancing, song, and other forms of entertainment).

Various food vendors will also offer assorted types of traditional Scottish refreshment and sustenance.

Major events in Scotland

Major events outside Scotland

Australia

Belgium

Bermuda

Brazil

Canada
On 1 August 1997 Canada Post issued 'Highland Games' designed by Fraser Ross, based on photographs by Andrew Balfour. The 45¢ stamps are perforated 12.5 x 13 and were printed by Canadian Bank Note Company, Limited.

Czech Republic

Hungary

Indonesia

New Zealand

Switzerland

United States

See also 

 The Gathering 2009
 Sport in Scotland
 Fergus Highland Games
 World Highland Games Championships
 Basque rural sports
 History of physical training and fitness

Notes

References 

https://www.albacampers.com/scottish-highland-games/

Bibliography 
 Michael Brander, Essential Guide to the Highland Games (1992) 
 Emily Ann Donaldson, The Scottish Highland Games in America (Pelican Publishing Company, Gretna, LA, 1986). .
 Joan F. Flett and Thomas M. Flett, Traditional Dancing in Scotland (London: Routledge & Kegan Paul 1964, 1985), 
 John G. Gibson, Traditional Gaelic Bagpiping, 1745–1945 (McGill-Queen's University Press, Montreal, 1998). . See esp. chapter 15, "Highland Games and Competition Piping"
 Ian R. Mitchell, "Rheumatism, Romanticism and Revolution: Victoria, Balmorality and 1848" in History Scotland (Vol. 5, #5, September/October 2005)
 John Prebble, The King's Jaunt (Edinburgh: Birlinn Ltd,1988., 2000), 
 Hugh Trevor-Roper, "The Invention of Tradition: The Highland Tradition of Scotland." in The Invention of Tradition ed. Eric Hobsbawm and Terence Ranger. Cambridge: Cambridge University Press, 1983, .
 David Webster, Scottish Highland Games (Edinburgh, Scotland 1973)

External links 

 The Scottish Highland Games Association
Official Scottish Tourist Board Highland Games Calendar 2011
COSCA Council of Scottish Clans and Associations
Highland Games FAQ: What to know before you go
US Scots: includes extensive listing of Highland games events
Tulloch Inverness Highland Games – Masters World Championships
The Official Highland Games Swiss Championships
What Are Highland Games?

 
Multi-sport events
Scottish games
Piping events
Sports festivals
Scottish culture
Celtic music festivals
Sports originating in Scotland